Episothalma is a genus of moths in the family Geometridae erected by Swinhoe in 1893.

Species
Episothalma robustraria (Guenée, 1857)
Episothalma cognataria Swinhoe, 1903

References

Hemitheini